This article lists political parties in Suriname.
Suriname has a multi-party system with numerous political parties, in which no one party often has a chance of gaining power alone, and parties must work with each other to form coalition governments.

Parties

Former parties 

 Basic Party for Renewal and Democracy (BVD)

See also
 Politics of Suriname
 List of political parties by country

Suriname
 
Political parties
Suriname
Political parties